Ces Cru (often stylized as CES Cru) is an American rap duo from Kansas City, Missouri, signed to independent record label Strange Music. The duo currently consists of members Donnie "Godemis" King and Mike "Ubiquitous" Viglione, but has had numerous members throughout the years. Ces Cru released their debut album Capture Enemy Soldiers in 2004. They went on to release Cesphiles, Vol. 1 Codename:irongiant (2008) and The Playground (2009). In 2010, the duo signed to Tech N9ne's record label Strange Music and have released the EP 13 (2012) and Recession Proof (2015). Their first two studio albums on the label are Constant Energy Struggles (2013), and Codename: Ego Stripper (2014). The most recent release from Ces Cru is their sixth studio album Catastrophic Event Specialists, released in February 2017. In 2021, both artists have since departed from the label.

Biography
The group went through a number of different group members before becoming the trio of Ubiquitous, Godemis and Sorceress in the early 2000s. In 2004, the group released its debut album, Capture Enemy Soldiers. But while promoting the project, Sorceress wanted to fire the group’s then-manager. Ubiquitous and Godemis disagreed, and Sorceress departed the group. They returned as a duo in 2009 with The Playground, an album they hand delivered to Strange Music label boss Tech N9ne when he witnessed the group opening for Devin the Dude at a Kansas City show. Tech signed them to Strange Music in January 2012, and eight months later they released their Strange Music debut, the 13 EP on August 28, 2012. On March 26, 2013, the duo released their fourth album Constant Energy Struggles. The album debuted at number 98 on the Billboard 200. On August 5, 2014, they released their fifth album Codename: Ego Stripper which debuted at number 40 on the Billboard 200.

Discography

Studio albums

Extended plays

Guest appearances

Music videos

References

American musical duos
Hip hop duos
Midwest hip hop groups
Musical groups established in 2000
Musical groups from Kansas City, Missouri
Rappers from Kansas City, Missouri